Rehan may refer to:
Rehan, India, a town in Himachal Pradesh
 Ada Rehan (c. 1857–1916), an Irish-born American actress
 Channi Taja Rehan, a village in Pakistan which is home to the Rehan clan
 Um ar-Rehan, a Palestinian village

See also
 Reyhan (disambiguation)